Two ships of the Royal Navy have borne the name HMS Aigle, after the French for Eagle:

 HMS Aigle was a French frigate launched in 1780 that the French navy purchased in 1782 and that the British captured that same year. The British took her into the Royal Navy as a 38-gun fifth rate under her existing name. She wrecked in 1798 on Plane Island (Île Plane) off Cape Farina, Tunisia, due to an error in navigation. All the crew were saved.
  was a 36-gun fifth rate launched in 1801. She was used as a coal hulk from 1853, sunk in shallow water during torpedo experiments, and was sold in 1870 for breaking up.

See also
 
 

Royal Navy ship names